The General Council of Aran (in Aranese Conselh Generau d'Aran) is the autonomous governing body of the region (unofficially considered a comarca) of Val d'Aran in Catalonia. The chamber is headed by the Síndic d'Aran.

Composition
The General Council of Aran is composed by 13 members elected every four years. Aran is divided into six electoral districts (terçons):

 Arties e Garòs: 2 members
 Castierò: 4 members
 Irissa: 1 member
 Marcatosa: 1 member
 Pujolò: 2 members
 Quatre Lòcs: 3 members

Síndic d'Aran 
The Síndic d'Aran is the head of the autonomous governing body and leads the General Council. He or she is also the ex officio chairman of all the  under the authority of the Council.

List of syndics

External links 
 Official website

Val d'Aran
Politics of the Val d'Aran